The Shapeshifter is a series of books by Ali Sparkes. The series follows the life of a boy named Dax Jones and is primarily set in England, firstly in the Cornwall area and later in the Lake District. During the first book, Finding the Fox, Dax discovers his ability to shapeshift into a fox, and is whisked away from his hated stepfamily by the government. Dax is one of a number of Colas (Children of Limitless Ability), young people who possess amazing supernatural powers. Some of his classmates are able to heal, move objects with their mind, communicate with the dead, or see into the future. These children attend a school called Tregarren College in Cornwall, which is later destroyed by a tidal wave, and the children move to Fenton Lodge, in the Lake District.

Series
The series includes Finding the Fox, Running the Risk, Going to Ground, Dowsing the Dead, Stirring the Storm, and Feather and Fang.

Awards
Finding the Fox was nominated for the Bolton Children's Book Award.

References

https://web.archive.org/web/20160313045056/http://alisparkes.com/shapeshifter.asp

External links
 Oxford University Press description page for Finding the Fox
 Ali Sparkes at OUP
 Ali Sparkes's website

 
2006 British novels
Fiction about shapeshifting
British fantasy novels
British thriller novels
Novels set in Devon
Novels set in Cornwall